Zodiac is an Enterprise ride at Thorpe Park, Surrey, United Kingdom.

History

The ride originally opened in 2000 as 'Enterprise', though it came to be renamed 'Zodiac' the following year to better suit the expanding Lost City theme alongside the opening of Vortex. This marked the decision to maintain the ride as a permanent installation, though an incident during the 2001 season, in which a gondola became partially detached from the main frame of the ride, leading to the park owners being fined for £65,000 in 2004, necessitated that the ride be replaced. The eventual replacement (for 2006) was yet another Huss Enterprise – sourced from Drayton Manor theme park – that was differently decorated to the original (2001–2004), having a plain white finish on the spokes and minimal red stripes. This has still not been rectified, suggesting that the park have no intention of doing so.

Ride experience

Riders enter small gondolas that are suspended next to a large disc that spins once the ride is in motion. The small gondolas seat two people and there are no restraints, the idea being that the force of the ride will hold you in place and allow you to experience the ride more freely. Ride operators run round the large disc to check that all the cabins have their gates closed correctly. When it is considered safe, Zodiac is put into motion. The disc starts to spin, slowly at first, but becoming faster and faster. Eventually, the suspended gondolas are being forced almost completely sideways at a speed of 13.5 revolutions per minute and the disc starts to pitch upwards into the air on a powerful hydraulic arm. Once the spinning disc has reached the maximum tilt of 70°, riders are almost inverting in the suspended cars, completing a manoeuvre similar to a vertical loop element of a rollercoaster. As soon as maximum tilt is reached, the arm lowers again, the disc slows and riders slowly come to a halt as gravity takes over and reorientates the base of the gondolas towards ground.

Safety
On the rare occasion that Zodiac (or any other HUSS Enterprise) tilts over 90 degrees, an emergency stop procedure is initiated. This is a very uncomfortable situation for guests as the gondolas swing uncontrollably until the wheel comes to a halt. The ride slowly lowers itself back to a level position.

See also
Thorpe Park
Enterprise (ride)

References

External links
Profile of ride

Thorpe Park
Amusement rides introduced in 2000
Amusement rides introduced in 2001
Amusement rides introduced in 2006
Amusement rides manufactured by HUSS Park Attractions